The 2016 Danish Individual Speedway Championship was the 2016 edition of the Danish Individual Speedway Championship. As in 2015, the final was staged over a single round. For the fifth year in a row, the title was won by Niels Kristian Iversen, who beat Kenneth Bjerre, Nicki Pedersen and Nicolai Klindt. It was the first time the title had been won by the same rider for five successive years since 1971, when Ole Olsen managed the feat.

Event format 
Each rider competed in five rides, with the four top scorers racing in an additional heat. The points from the additional heat were then added to the previous score from the five riders. The winner was the rider who accumulated the most points in all of their rides, and not the rider who won the additional heat.

Final

References 

Denmark
Speedway in Denmark
2016 in Danish motorsport